Rutan (also Romanized as Rūtān, Rootan, and Rowtān) is a village in Bemani Rural District, Byaban District, Minab County, Hormozgan Province, Iran. At the 2006 census, its population was 546, in 104 families.

References 

Populated places in Minab County